Kenneth Lyle Polivka (January 21, 1921 – July 23, 1988), nicknamed "Soup", was a professional baseball player.  He was a left-handed pitcher for one season (1947) with the Cincinnati Reds.  For his career, he did not record a decision, with a 3.00 earned run average, and one strikeouts in three innings pitched.

He was born in Chicago, Illinois and died in Aurora, Illinois at the age of 67.

External links

1921 births
1988 deaths
Cincinnati Reds players
Major League Baseball pitchers
Baseball players from Illinois
Ogden Reds players
Columbia Reds players
Birmingham Barons players
Syracuse Chiefs players
Memphis Chickasaws players
Denver Bears players
Tulsa Oilers (baseball) players
Charleston Senators players
Knoxville Smokies players